Mikhail Artyukhov (born 15 September 1943) is a Soviet former skier. He competed in the Nordic combined at the 1968 Winter Olympics and the 1972 Winter Olympics.

References

External links
 

1943 births
Living people
Soviet male Nordic combined skiers
Olympic Nordic combined skiers of the Soviet Union
Nordic combined skiers at the 1968 Winter Olympics
Nordic combined skiers at the 1972 Winter Olympics
People from Sortavala
Sportspeople from the Republic of Karelia